Kicha is an Indian film director, who has directed Tamil films. After making his debut in 1996 with Nethaji, he has gone on to make other ventures including Thee and Maasi.

Career
He began his career with Nethaji (1996), before re-emerging in the 2000s with a series of low budget films. In the late 2000s, he made a series of police films including Thee with Sundar C, Bhavani with Sneha and Maasi with Arjun. He also went on to produce his first film which he did not direct, making Prasath's Eppadi Manasukkul Vanthai (2012).

Filmography

References

Living people
Tamil film directors
Film directors from Tamil Nadu
Year of birth missing (living people)
20th-century Indian film directors
21st-century Indian film directors
Screenwriters from Tamil Nadu
Film producers from Tamil Nadu
Tamil screenwriters
Tamil film producers